Naramatac was a catamaran sailboat designed by Robert B. Harris in 1948 and launched in 1950. Its innovative use of asymmetric hulls later became a hallmark of the Hobie Cat.

Concept

Efficacy
Harris' design was not entirely successful, however. At speed the flat bottoms pounded, and it showed poor performance in low wind which he ascribed to deep hulls (particularly aft), lack of stability to carry additional sail, too much wetted surface, and too heavy construction.

See also
 List of multihulls

References

Individual catamarans
Sailboat type designs by Robert B. Harris